Geoffrey von Maltzahn (born July 22, 1980) is an American biological engineer and businessman in the biotechnology and life sciences industry who has founded a number of companies including Indigo Agriculture, Sana Biotechnology, Kaleido Biosciences, Seres Therapeutics, Axcella Health, Generate Biomedicines and Tessera Therapeutics. He has over 200 bioengineering and biotechnology patents and applications.

Early life and education 

Geoffrey von Maltzahn was born in Arlington, Texas, and subsequently moved to Alexandria, Virginia where he graduated from Thomas Jefferson High School for Science and Technology. He was awarded his B.S. in Chemical Engineering from the Massachusetts Institute of Technology (MIT) in 2003, his Master of Science degree in Bioengineering from the University of California, San Diego in 2005, and his PhD from the Harvard–MIT Division of Health Sciences and Technology at the Massachusetts Institute of Technology in 2010.

Career 

Von Maltzahn is a general partner at Flagship Pioneering, a Massachusetts-based firm that creates start-ups in the healthcare and agriculture industries. He joined in 2009, and focuses on inventing and building new life science companies. In the same year, he co-founded Axcella Health, a company focused on developing amino acid therapeutics. In 2010, he co-founded Seres Therapeutics and served as the Chief Technology Officer. In 2020, Seres’ SER-109 became the first microbiome-based drug to report positive phase 3 data. In 2013, he co-founded Indigo Agriculture, a company focused on improving the microbiome of modern crops and is currently Chief Innovation Officer and a board member. In 2018, he co-founded Generate Biomedicines, a generative biology company using machine learning to discover new therapeutics. In the same year, he co-founded Tessera Therapeutics, a company that focuses on altering genes in the human genome using technology it calls gene writing. Tessera raised over $300m in funding in 2022.

In February 2021, his company Sana Biotechnology raised the largest record IPO for a preclinical biotechnology company.

Awards and recognition
 Bloomberg 50’s Ones to Watch    
 Fierce Biotech: The Most Influential People in Biopharma 
 Business Insider’s Power Players Fierce Biotech: The Most Influential People in Biopharma 
 Endpoints 20 under 40 biopharma executives 
 Business Insider's 30 Biotech Leaders Under 40 - 2017
 MSNBC's Inventions of the Year - 2009

References

1980 births
Engineers from California
21st-century American businesspeople
Living people
MIT School of Engineering alumni
University of California, San Diego alumni
21st-century American inventors
Harvard University alumni
Thomas Jefferson High School for Science and Technology alumni